Irwin Glusker (June 8, 1924 – August 30, 2022) was an American art director.

Life and career 
Glusker was born in Brooklyn, New York, the son of Ida Schmitt, a dressmaker and Hyman Glusker, a shoemaker. He attended Boys High School, and went on to attend Cooper Union. He joined the United States Army at the age of 18, serving as a private. Glusker was discharged from the army and returned to New York in 1948. 

In 1967, Glusker designed the Central Park Boathouse Dedicatory Sculpture, which is also known as The Rowers. 

Glusker worked for American Heritage, and was the art director for Life magazine. He then established his own design business and produced numerous books for singer and actor Frank Sinatra and other celebrities.

In 1986, Glusker wrote a memoir about his life and career. He died in August 2022 at his home in Manhattan, New York, at the age of 98.

References 

1924 births
2022 deaths
People from Brooklyn
American art directors
American designers
Cooper Union alumni
20th-century American artists
21st-century American artists
Life (magazine) people
Businesspeople from New York (state)
20th-century American businesspeople